The 2013 Brasil Open was a tennis tournament played on indoor clay courts. It was the 13th edition of the event known as the Brasil Open, and is part of the ATP World Tour 250 series of the 2013 ATP World Tour. It took place from February 11 through February 17, 2013, in São Paulo, Brazil.

Singles main draw entrants

Seeds 

1 Rankings as of February 4, 2013.

Other entrants 
The following players received wildcards into the main draw:
 Ricardo Mello
 Rafael Nadal  
 Tommy Robredo

The following players received entry from the qualifying draw:
 Jorge Aguilar
 Paul Capdeville
 Guilherme Clezar
 João Souza

The following player received entry as lucky loser:
 Martín Alund

Withdrawals
Before the tournament
 Aljaž Bedene
 Leonardo Mayer (back injury)
 Stanislas Wawrinka

Retirements
 Rubén Ramírez Hidalgo (right ankle sprain)
 Horacio Zeballos (general fatigue)

Doubles main draw entrants

Seeds 

1 Rankings are as of February 4, 2013.

Other entrants 
The following pairs received wildcards into the main draw:
 Guilherme Clezar /  Gastão Elias
 Marcelo Demoliner /  Pedro Zerbini

Withdrawals
During the tournament
 Fabio Fognini (left leg injury)
 Rafael Nadal (knee overuse)

Champions

Singles 

 Rafael Nadal def.  David Nalbandian, 6–2, 6–3

Doubles 

 Alexander Peya /  Bruno Soares def.   František Čermák /  Michal Mertiňák, 6–7(5–7), 6–2, [10–7]

References

External links 
 

 
Brasil Open